David Robert Nelson (born May 22, 1942) is an American politician who served as a State Representative and Sheriff of Bristol County, Massachusetts.

Early life
Nelson was born on May 22, 1942 in New Bedford, Massachusetts. He attended New Bedford public schools, Providence College, Sacred Heart Major Seminary, and Saint Mary's College. Prior to becoming sheriff, Nelson worked as a rare book dealer.

Early political career
From 1970 to 1976, Nelson was a New Bedford City Councilor. He was elected council president in 1974. From 1977 to 1978 he was City Clerk.

From 1979 to 1983, Nelson represented the 12th Bristol District in the Massachusetts House of Representatives.

Sheriff
In 1983, Nelson was appointed Bristol County Sheriff by Governor Michael Dukakis following the resignation of Edward Dabrowski. He was elected to finish Dabrowski's term in 1984 by winning a five-way Democratic primary. He was elected unopposed to a full term in 1986 and won the 1992 Democratic primary with 62% of the vote. Nelson resigned in 1997 and was succeeded by his Assistant Deputy Superintendent Thomas Hodgson.

References

1942 births
American booksellers
Massachusetts city council members
Massachusetts sheriffs
Democratic Party members of the Massachusetts House of Representatives
Politicians from New Bedford, Massachusetts
Saint Mary's University of Minnesota alumni
Living people
City and town clerks